The Truce of Deulino (also known as Peace or Treaty of Dywilino) concluded the Polish–Muscovite War (1609–1618) between the Polish–Lithuanian Commonwealth and the Tsardom of Russia. It was signed on 11 December 1618 and took effect on 4 January 1619.

The agreement marked the greatest geographical expansion of the Commonwealth (0,99 million km²), which lasted until the Commonwealth conceded the loss of Livonia in 1629. The Commonwealth gained control over the Smolensk and Chernihiv Voivodeships. The truce was set to expire within 14.5 years. The parties exchanged prisoners, including Filaret Romanov, Patriarch of Moscow.

Władysław IV, son of Commonwealth king Sigismund III Vasa, refused to relinquish his claim to the Moscow throne. Therefore, in 1632, when the Truce of Deulino expired and Sigismund III died, hostilities were immediately resumed in the course of a conflict known as the Smolensk War, which ended in the Treaty of Polanów in 1634.

References

1618 in the Polish–Lithuanian Commonwealth
Deulino
Deulino
Poland–Russia relations
1618 treaties
1619 treaties
Deulino
Treaties of the Tsardom of Russia
1618 in Russia
Bilateral treaties of Russia